Olga Viktorovna Andrianova (born 12 June 1949) is a Soviet athlete. She competed in the women's discus throw at the 1976 Summer Olympics.

References

External links

1949 births
Living people
Athletes (track and field) at the 1976 Summer Olympics
Soviet female discus throwers
Olympic athletes of the Soviet Union